"When No One Remembers His Name, Does God Retire?" is a science fiction short story by American writer Orson Scott Card.  It only appears in his short story collection Capitol.

Plot summary
As a boy Garol Stipock was a member of the Church of the Undying Voice.  One of the main beliefs of this church was that the use of the fictional drug Somec was evil.  Shortly after Garol’s great grandfather died the small church broke up.  Garol then went to school and as he grew older he decided that God did not exist.  Eventually he became a brilliant scientist and was put into suspended animation using Somec to extend his life.  When he was a young man he discovered that the church was right and that the use of Somec was wrong because most of the people who were on it did nothing to deserve to have their lives extended.  As a result, Garol joined a group of revolutionaries that claimed it wanted to take over the government so that it could reform the rules for Somec use.  Later, he realized that the people in the group had no real interest in reform but only wanted to guarantee their own supply of the drug.  Although he quit working with the revolutionaries he was soon arrested for trying to overthrow the government.

Connection to the Worthing Saga
This book uses several plot elements also used in The Worthing Saga, such as the sleeping drug Somec and the taping of memories.  This story explains how Stipock ended up on Jason Worthing's colony ship in Card’s novel The Worthing Chronicle.

See also
List of works by Orson Scott Card
Orson Scott Card

External links
 The official Orson Scott Card website

1978 short stories
Short stories by Orson Scott Card